Cappellini and Capellini are Italian surnames, possibly derivatives of Capelli or Capello. It is also used as a Spanish surname. Notable people with those surnames include:

Ada Itúrrez de Cappellini, Argentine Justicialist Party politician
Anna Cappellini, Italian ice dancer
Antonio Capellini (born ), Italian engraver
Gabriele Cappellini (active ), Italian painter
Giovanni Capellini (1833-1922), Italian geologist and paleontologist, Senator of the Kingdom of Italy
Giulio Cappellini, owner of Italian design firm Cappellini
Massimiliano Cappellini, retired Italian professional football player
Nicola Capellini (born 1991), Italian footballer
Renato Cappellini, retired Italian professional football player
 Rinaldo E. Cappellini (1895-1966), UMWA District 1 President (PA),1923 and 1925
 Gifford S. Cappellini (1925-2016), Judge, Court of Common Pleas, Luzerne County, PA 1985-2005

See also
Alfredo Cappellini (S 507), an Italian submarine
Comandante Cappellini, an Italian submarine
Capelli (disambiguation)
Capello (disambiguation)

Italian-language surnames